Victoria Christopher Murray is an American editor and author of over 30 books, with "more than one million books in print."

Personal life and education 
Murray was born in Queens, New York. She received a Bachelor of Arts in Communication Disorders from Hampton University and a Master of Business Administration from New York University Stern School of Business. She is a member of Delta Sigma Theta.

Murray now spends her time in Washington, D.C. and Los Angeles.

Career 
After working in business for ten years, Murray launched a financial services agency for Aegon, USA, where she worked for nine years. 

Murray published her first book, Temptation, in 1997. As she continued writing, she became known for her Christian fiction geared toward African American readers, though the genre didn't exist when she published Temptation. Murray stated, "I knew that I wanted to write a book that was entertaining, compelling and put God in the middle and still have the book be a page-turner." Later, Murray explained that she hated the "Christian fiction label," saying, "I think it limits our readership ... I’m not writing for people who are already in church. If I had to say who I was trying to gain, it’s people who never entered a church.”

Since her Temptation, Murray has published over 30 novels.

In 2014, Murray launched Brown Girls Publishing alongside ReShonda Tate Billingsley.

Awards

Publications

Adult novels 
 Joy (2001)
 Truth Be Told (2004)
 Grown Folks Business (2005)
 The Deal, the Dance, and the Devil (2011)
 Destiny's Divas (2012)
 Never Say Never (2013)
 Touched by an Angel, co-authored with Princess FL Gooden (2014)
 Stand Your Ground (2015)
 It Should've Been Me, co-authored with ReShonda Tate Billingsley (2016)
 If Only For One Night, co-authored with ReShonda Tate Billingsley (2018)
 The Personal Librarian, co-authored with Marie Benedict (2021)

The Ex Files 
 The Ex Files (2007)
 Merry Ex-Mas (2013)
 Forever an Ex (2014)

Jasmine series (1997-2017) 
 Temptation (1997)
 A Sin and a Shame (2006)
 Too Little, Too Late (2008)
 Lady Jasmine (2009)
 Sins of the Mother (2010)
 Scandalous (2012)
 Sinners & Saints, co-authored with ReShonda Tate Billingsley (2012)
 Friends & Foes, co-authored with ReShonda Tate Billingsley (2013)
 Fortune & Fame, co-authored with ReShonda Tate Billingsley (2014)
 A Blessing & A Curse, co-authored with ReShonda Tate Billingsley (2017)
 Temptation: The Aftermath (2017)

Seven Deadly Sins series (2017-2021) 
 Lust (2017)
 Envy (2018)
 Greed (2019)
 Wrath (2021)

Teen novels

Divas series 
 Diamond (2008)
 India (2008)
 Veronique (2009)
 Aaliyah (2009)

References 

Hampton University alumni
New York University Stern School of Business alumni
New York University alumni
Writers from Queens, New York
21st-century American writers
21st-century American women writers
20th-century American writers
20th-century American women writers
Year of birth missing (living people)
Living people